The 677th Aircraft Control and Warning Squadron is an inactive United States Air Force unit. It was last assigned to the 30th Air Division, Air Defense Command, stationed at Alpena Air Force Station, Michigan. It was inactivated on 30 November 1957.

The unit was a General Surveillance Radar squadron providing for the air defense of the United States.

Lineage

 Established as 677th Aircraft Control and Warning Squadron
 Activated on 1 September 1953
 Inactivated on 30 November 1957

Assignments

 4711th Defense Wing, 1 September 1953
 4708th Defense Wing, 5 May 1954
 30th Air Division, 8 July 1956 – 30 November 1957

Stations

 Fort Williams, Maine, 1 September 1953
 Willow Run AFS, Michigan, 1 April 1954 (not manned or equipped)
 Alpena AFS, Michigan, 1 December 1954 – 30 November 1957

References

  Cornett, Lloyd H. and Johnson, Mildred W., A Handbook of Aerospace Defense Organization  1946 - 1980,  Office of History, Aerospace Defense Center, Peterson AFB, CO (1980).
 Winkler, David F. & Webster, Julie L., Searching the Skies, The Legacy of the United States Cold War Defense Radar Program,  US Army Construction Engineering Research Laboratories, Champaign, IL (1997).

External links

Radar squadrons of the United States Air Force
Aerospace Defense Command units